Professor Surendra Nath Pandeya (1939 – 2012) was an Indian medicinal and organic chemist. He made several contributions in the design and discovery of anticonvulsant, antitubercular, anti-HIV, anti-cancer, antibacterial, and antimicrobial molecules. His research focused on semicarbazones, Mannich bases, thiadiazoles, benzothiazoles, and oxindole compounds.

Early life and education
Dr. S.N. Pandeya was born in Ballia, India, to Kapil Deo Pandey and Gangajali Devi Pandey. He attended Banaras Hindu University in 1954 to pursue both his BSc. and MSc. He began his career with two-years as a lecturer at the University of Kharagpur and later returned to Banaras Hindu University where he completed his Ph.D. in organic chemistry in 1965 under Professor R.H. Sahasrabudhe.

Scientific research
Over his research career, Pandeya worked at and visited several institutions, including the UIC College of Pharmacy (1967 – 1968), the University of Georgia (1968 – 1969) and the University of Saskatchewan as a Canadian Commonwealth emeritus fellow (1992 – 1993). He established several international collaborative efforts with organizations such as the National Cancer Research Institute, National Institute of Neurological Disorders and Stroke and Katholieke Universiteit Leuven with world Professor Erik De Clercq.

Pandeya published over 275 research articles in peer-reviewed journals. He wrote 18 books in the areas of medicinal and organic chemistry. His supervision led to the awarding of 22 Ph.D. and 75 M.Pharm. degrees.

References

1939 births
2012 deaths
Banaras Hindu University alumni
Indian organic chemists